Farol de Ponta Norte is a lighthouse in the northernmost point of the island of Sal, Cape Verde. It is located near the headland Ponta Norte. The original lighthouse was a 13 metres high cast iron tower, constructed in 1897. This was replaced with a masonry tower around 1940, which is now in ruins. The current light is on a 5 metres metal tower.

See also

List of lighthouses in Cape Verde
List of buildings and structures in Cape Verde

References

External links
A photo of the lighthouse in ruins at e-Caboverde

Ponta Norte
Sal, Cape Verde
Lighthouses completed in 1897
1890s establishments in Cape Verde